The Avis Dam is a dam outside of Windhoek, Namibia. It was built in 1933 by the South African colonial authorities. It first flooded in April 1934, but only exceeded 75% again in 2007.

Fauna
There are at least 187 different species of birds in the area.

References

Dams in Namibia
Buildings and structures in Windhoek
Dams completed in 1933 
1933 establishments in South West Africa